Malandasa was a town of ancient Cappadocia, inhabited in Byzantine times. 

Its site is located near Ovalıbağ, Asiatic Turkey.

References

Populated places in ancient Cappadocia
Former populated places in Turkey
Populated places of the Byzantine Empire
History of Niğde Province